Liu Yingming (8 October 1940 – 15 July 2016) was a Chinese mathematician. He was an academician of the Chinese Academy of Sciences (CAS).

Biography
Liu graduated from Peking University in 1963, majoring in mathematics. He was assigned to Sichuan University after his graduation. His research field was topology and fuzzy mathematics, mainly in the algebra problem of unclear topology, embedded theory and nonclear convex sets. Liu was the deputy president of Sichuan University between 1989 and 2005. He was elected an academician of the Chinese Academy of Sciences in 1995. Liu joined Jiusan Society in 1995. He was the vice chairman of the central committee of Jiusan Society from 1997 to 2007.

Liu was diagnosed as leukemia in November 2015. He died on 15 July 2016 at the age of 75 in Chengdu.

References

1940 births
2016 deaths
Deaths from cancer in the People's Republic of China
Deaths from leukemia
Educators from Fujian
Mathematicians from Fujian
Members of the Chinese Academy of Sciences
Members of the Jiusan Society
Peking University alumni
People from Fuzhou
Academic staff of Sichuan University